The Adhiparasakthi Engineering College, Melmaruvathur  is one of the educational institutions functioning under the Adhiparasakthi Charitable, Medical, Educational and Cultural Trust. The institution is approved by the Government of Tamil Nadu and the All India Council for Technical Education and is affiliated to Anna University. All the departments of this college were accredited by National Board of Accreditation.

History and location 

Established in 1984, the Adhiparasakthi Engineering College is located near Arulmigu Adhiparasakthi Siddhar Peedam which is situated at Melmaruvathur (in Tamil Nadu) 92 km South of Chennai on the NH 45 towards Trichy.

Founders 

The founder is Bangaru Adigalar; the Chairperson is Sakthi Tmt. V. Lakshmi Bangaru Adigalar, Vice- President, ACMEC Trust and the Managing Director is Dr. G. B. Senthilkumar.

Departments 

 Department of Civil Engineering
 Department of Mechanical Engineering
 Department of Electronics & Communication Engineering
 Department of Electrical & Electronics Engineering
 Department of Computer Science & Engineering
 Department of Information Technology
 Department of Chemical Engineering (Started at 1997)
 Department of Management Studies (Started at 1996)
 Department of Computer Applications (Started at 1998)

References

External links 
 http://adhiparasakthi.in

Engineering colleges in Tamil Nadu
Colleges affiliated to Anna University
Education in Tiruvannamalai district
Educational institutions established in 1984
1984 establishments in Tamil Nadu